Hans-Jürgen Pohmann (born 23 May 1947) is a former professional tennis player from Germany.

During his career, Pohmann won two singles and five doubles titles on the ATP Tour. , he was a commentator for the German television network RBB.

ATP Tour finals

Singles (1 title, 2 runner-ups)

Doubles (5 titles, 13 runner-ups)

External links
 
 
 

1947 births
Living people
Tennis players from Cologne
Tennis commentators
West German male tennis players